Houssem Mabrouk (born 8 December 1990) is a retired Tunisian football defender.

References

1990 births
Living people
Tunisian footballers
CA Bizertin players
Stade Gabèsien players
Association football midfielders
Tunisian Ligue Professionnelle 1 players